Eshaqabad (also Romanized as Esḩāqābād) is a village in Derakhtengan Rural District, in the Central District of Kerman County, Kerman Province, Iran. At the 2006 census, its population was 49, in 13 families.

References 

Populated places in Kerman County